Charlie Jones ( 24 March 1880 –  6 Mar 1908) was a South African international rugby union player who played as a fullback.

He made 2 appearances for South Africa against the British Lions in 1903.

References

South African rugby union players
South Africa international rugby union players
1880 births
1908 deaths
Rugby union players from Kimberley, Northern Cape
Rugby union fullbacks